Cho Hyo-chul (born 1 September 1986) is a South Korean Greco-Roman wrestler. In 2018, he won the gold medal in the 97 kg event at the 2018 Asian Games held in Jakarta, Indonesia.

Cho attended Gwangju Physical Education High School.

References

External links 
 

Living people
1986 births
Place of birth missing (living people)
South Korean male sport wrestlers
Wrestlers at the 2018 Asian Games
Asian Games medalists in wrestling
Asian Games gold medalists for South Korea
Medalists at the 2018 Asian Games
Asian Wrestling Championships medalists
21st-century South Korean people